Eve Mahlab AO is a prominent Australian business and social entrepreneur.

Biography
She studied law at Melbourne University and in 1968, started a home-based business, Mahlab and Associates, which focused on the recruitment of lawyers. This eventually grew into the nationally known Mahlab Group of Companies operating in legal recruitment, legal costing and publishing.

After retiring from active business management, Eve accepted several non-executive board appointments including the Walter and Eliza Hall Institute of Medical Research and Film Australia Inc. She was the first woman elected to the board of Westpac.

As a community activist, she is an articulate advocate for the advancement of women. She was an early member of the Women's Electoral Lobby and was the first woman elected to the Council of Monash University. She co-founded the annual large scale Sydney community event "Carols in the Domain" as well as the "Know Biz" Business Education Project which enabled thousands of students and teachers to visit large and small businesses.

In 1982, she was named Australian Businesswoman of the Year. In 1988, she was awarded the Order of Australia (AO) for services to government, business and the community, especially women. In 1997, she accepted an Honorary Doctorate of Laws from Monash University.

She is the co-founder and ex-chairwoman of the Australian Women Donors Network. Its purpose is to integrate gender considerations into public and private funding and to promote funding of projects which specifically target women and girls or are transparently inclusive of them.

References
Mitchell, Susan. Tall Poppies. Angus and Robertson, 1984.
Bowen, Jan. The Fabulous Fifties pp 58–68. Angus and Robertson, 1995.
Sawer, Marian. Making Women Count: A History of the Women's Electoral Lobby. UNSW Press, 2008.

External links

1937 births
Living people
Australian women's rights activists
Officers of the Order of Australia
Recipients of the Centenary Medal